John C. Peck (October 6, 1828 – unknown) was a businessman and building contractor from Atlanta, Georgia. Peck is known for constructing some of Atlanta's most notable early buildings including the Kimball House hotels.  He was also the Chief of the Department of Construction for the 1881 International Cotton Exposition under Director-General Hannibal Kimball.

Early life
Peck was born on October 6, 1828, in Ellsworth, Connecticut, the son of George W. Peck and his wife Hannah.  He was the fourth of seven children.  He married Josephine Hoyt in 1853.

References

History of Atlanta
1828 births
Year of death missing